Andrew Picken Orr FRSE ARIC (1898–1962) was a 20th-century Scottish oceanographer and was an expert on phytoplankton and copepod biology.

Life
He was born in Ayrshire on 6 August 1898. He was educated at Kilmarnock Academy.

In the First World War he served as a 2nd Lieutenant in the Royal Scots Fusiliers. He served in France and was wounded in action then captured as a prisoner-of-war. After the war he studied science at Glasgow University graduating with MA and BSc degrees.

In 1923 he became a chemist at the Millport Research Station and in 1929 was part of the Great Barrier Reef Expedition with Sheina Marshall, subsequently working with her for around 40 years in total. During the Second World War, they worked with Lillie Newton and Elsie Conway on sourcing of pharmaceutical agar from UK marine algae. Orr rose to be Depute Director of the station.

In 1948 he was elected a Fellow of the Royal Society of Edinburgh. His proposers were Sir Maurice Yonge, Charles Wynford Parsons, Otto Lowenstein and James Wilfred Cook.

He died on 19 September 1962. On his death Sheina Marshall became Depute Director at Millport.

Publications
Sedimentation on Low Isles Reef (1931)
The Biology of a Marine Copepod (1955) with Sheina Marshall
On the Biology of Calanus Finmarchicus (1955) with Sheina Marshall

References

1898 births
1961 deaths
People from Ayrshire
People educated at Kilmarnock Academy
Alumni of the University of Glasgow
British oceanographers
British World War I prisoners of war
Fellows of the Royal Society of Edinburgh
Royal Scots Fusiliers officers
British Army personnel of World War I